Ronco Scrivia is a comune (municipality) in the Metropolitan City of Genoa in the Italian region Liguria, located about  north of Genoa.

Ronco Scrivia borders the following municipalities: Busalla, Fraconalto, Isola del Cantone, Voltaggio.

History
Ronco is mentioned for the first time in an 1127 document. It was held by the bishops of Tortona until the 13th century, and then by the Spinola family and later by the Republic of Genoa. Together with the whole Republic of Genoa, Ronco became part of the Kingdom of Sardinia in 1815.

Being a major railroad junction point between Genoa and Turin, it was heavily bombed by Allied planes during the late World War II.

Main sights
Parish church of San Martino (17th century). It houses canvasses by Orazio De Ferrari and Giovanni Lorenzo Bertolotto
Parish church of Santa Maria Assunta (12th century, rebuilt in the 17th century), in the frazione of Borgo Fornari.
Sanctuary of Madonna della Bastia
Abbey of Santa Maria al Porale, in the eponymous frazione.
Marquisses Palace, now housing the town hall
Castle of Ronco Scrivia (11th-12th centuries), a former noble residence of the Spinola. Today only a few fragments remain of the original medieval fortress.
Villa Davidson (1909-1910), a patrician villa in Borgo Fornari.
Castle of Borgo Fornari (12th century). Now mostly in ruins, aside from a tower, it once commanded the road in the Valle Scrivia to the former Genoese fief of Voltaggio.

See also
 Parco naturale regionale dell'Antola

References

Cities and towns in Liguria